DJ - The Hits Collection is a best of album by popular Greek singer, Marianta Pieridi. It was released in Greece in October 2006 by Universal Music Greece, including 3 new songs and a previously unreleased one.

Track listing
 "DJ (Stanna Eller Go)"
 "Mono An Isoun Trelos (Anlayamatin)"
 "Parte Ton"
 "S'agapo"
 "Oute Ki Esi"
 "Vale Fantasia"
 "Mine Dipla Mou"
 "Giro Mou"
 "Aplose Ta Heria Sou"
 "Heretismata"
 "Afti I Agapi"
 "Ena"
 "Iparhoun Kati Andres"
 "Abra Katabra"
 "Viasou"
 "Ta Pio Megala Onira"
 "Ginekes / Vale Fantasia (featuring Goin'Through)"

References

2006 compilation albums
Greek-language albums
Mariada Pieridi albums
Universal Music Greece compilation albums